The Might and Power, registered as the Caulfield Stakes is a Melbourne Racing Club Group 1 Thoroughbred horse race run under weight-for-age conditions, for three-year-olds and upwards, run over a distance of 2,000 metres at Caulfield Racecourse, Melbourne, Australia.  Prizemoney is A$1,000,000.

History
The race is held annually in October on Caulfield Guineas day, the first day of the MRC Spring Carnival. The conditions of the race in regard to distance and WFA is similar to the W. S. Cox Plate, held a fortnight after the Caulfield Stakes, and many Cox Plate contenders will use this race as a preparatory race.

During World War II the race was run at Flemington Racecourse.

The 2016 edition of the race attracted only three entries, the smallest ever G1 race in Australia with champion mare Winx scaring off potential rivals. In 2021 the race was renamed The Might and Power to honour the 1997 Caulfield Cup and Melbourne Cup winner who won this race back in 1998.

Name
1886–1996  - Caulfield Stakes
1997–2010  - Yalumba Stakes
2011–2015 - Caulfield Stakes
2016–2019 - Ladbrokes Stakes
2020 - Neds Stakes
2021 onwards - Neds Might and Power Stakes

Distance
1886–1887 - 1 miles (~1800 metres)
1888 - 1 miles (~2000 metres)
1889–1967 - 1 miles (~1800 metres)
1968–1971 - 1 miles (~2000 metres)
1972 onwards - 2000 metres

Grade
1886–1978 - Principal Race
1979 onwards - Group 1

Double winners

Thoroughbreds that have won the Caulfield Stakes – W. S. Cox Plate double: 
Tranquil Star (1942), Rising Fast (1954), Kingston Town (1981-2), Bonecrusher (1986), Might and Power (1998), Northerly (2001), So You Think (2010), Ocean Park (2012), Winx (2016)
 
Thoroughbreds that have won the Caulfield Stakes – Caulfield Cup double:
Eurythmic (1920), High Syce (1929), Amounis (1930), Tranquil Star (1942), Rising Fast (1954), Redcraze (1956), Sometime (1963), How Now (1976), Sydeston (1990)

1922 racebook

Gallery of noted winners

Winners

2021 - Probabeel
2020 - Arcadia Queen
2019 - Cape Of Good Hope
2018 - Benbatl
2017 - Gailo Chop
2016 - Winx
2015 - Criterion
2014 - Fawkner
2013 - Atlantic Jewel
2012 - Ocean Park
2011 - Descarado
2010 - So You Think
2009 - Whobegotyou
2008 - Douro Valley
2007 - Maldivian
2006 - Casual Pass
2005 - El Segundo
2004 - Mummify
2003 - Lonhro
2002 - Lonhro
2001 - Northerly
2000 - Sky Heights
1999 - Northern Drake
1998 - Might And Power
1997 - Filante
1996 - Juggler
1995 - Danewin
1994 - Rough Habit
1993 - Naturalism
1992 - Castletown
1991 - Shaftesbury Avenue
1990 - Sydeston
1989 - Almaarad
1988 - Sky Chase
1987 - Drought
1986 - Bonecrusher
1985 - Tristarc
1984 - Alibhai
1983 - Mr. McGinty
1982 - Kingston Town
1981 - Kingston Town
1980 - Hyperno
1979 - Mighty Kingdom
1978 - Lloyd Boy
1977 - Family Of Man
1976 - How Now
1975 - † Guest Star / Zambari 
1974 - Igloo
1973 - Glengowan
1972 - Gunsynd
1971 - Gay Icarus
1970 - † Gay Poss / Arctic Symbol 
1969 - Hamua
1968 - Future
1967 - Winfreux
1966 - Winfreux
1965 - Winfreux
1964 - Contempler
1963 - Sometime
1962 - Sky High
1961 - Sky High
1960 - † Lord / Dhaulagiri 
1959 - Lord
1958 - Lord
1957 - Ray Ribbon
1956 - Redcraze
1955 - Prince Cortauld
1954 - Rising Fast
1953 - Flying Halo
1952 - Peshawar
1951 - Grey Boots
1950 - Comic Court
1949 - Iron Duke
1948 - De La Salle
1947 - Columnist
1946 - Bernborough
1945 - Lawrence
1944 - Lawrence
1943 - Amana
1942 - Tranquil Star
1941 - Lucrative
1940 - High Caste
1939 - High Caste
1938 - Ajax
1937 - Charles Fox
1936 - Young Idea
1935 - Feldspar
1934 - Hall Mark 
1933 - Chatham
1932 - Middle Watch
1931 - Cimbrian
1930 - Amounis
1929 - High Syce
1928 - Gothic
1927 - Royal Charter
1926 - Manfred
1925 - Heroic
1924 - The Hawk
1923 - Maid Of The Mist
1922 - Eurythmic
1921 - Eurythmic
1920 - Eurythmic
1919 - Night Watch
1918 - Magpie
1917 - Lanius
1916 - Lavendo
1915 - Traquette
1914 - Anna Carlovna
1913 - Mountain Princess
1912 - Royal Scotch
1911 - Malt King
1910 - Artillerie
1909 - Artillerie
1908 - Pink 'Un
1907 - Ebullition
1906 - Solution
1905 - Torah
1904 - Gladsome
1903 - Abundance
1902 - Wakeful
1901 - Wakeful
1900 - Severity
1899 - Australian Star
1898 - The Chief
1897 - Coil
1896 - Hopscotch
1895 - Atlas
1894 - The Harvester
1893 - Brockleigh
1892 - Camoola
1891 - Marvel
1890 - The Admiral
1889 - Dreadnought
1888 - Mentor
1887 - Cranbrook
1886 - Isonomy

† Dead heat

See also
 List of Australian Group races
 Group races

References

Open middle distance horse races
Group 1 stakes races in Australia
Caulfield Racecourse
Recurring sporting events established in 1948